The men's hammer throw event at the 1995 Summer Universiade was held on 29 August at the Hakatanomori Athletic Stadium in Fukuoka, Japan.

Results

References

Athletics at the 1995 Summer Universiade
1995